Manchester North  was one of six single-member Parliamentary constituencies created in 1885 by the division of the existing three-member Parliamentary Borough of Manchester.  It was abolished in 1918.

Boundaries
The constituency was created by the Redistribution of Seats Act 1885, and was defined as consisting of the following areas:
St. Michael's Ward,
The Parish of Harpurhey,
and "so much of the Parish of Newton as lies to the north-west of a line drawn along the centre of the Oldham Road".

The next redistribution took place under the terms of the Representation of the People Act 1918. The bulk of the seat became part of the new constituency of Manchester Platting, with parts passing to Manchester Exchange and Manchester Clayton.

Members of Parliament

Elections

Elections in the 1880s

Elections in the 1890s

Elections in the 1900s

Elections in the 1910s

References

Sources 
Election Results:
https://web.archive.org/web/20060520143104/http://www.manchester.gov.uk/elections/archive/gen1900.htm
https://web.archive.org/web/20060520143047/http://www.manchester.gov.uk/elections/archive/gen1945.htm
Entry for Arthur Henry Aylmer Morton in 'Who Was Who' accessed via http://www.knowuk.co.uk
Schwann:
Namechange http://homepage.eircom.net/~lawedd/TITLESM-Z.htm
Image and biography http://www.spinningtheweb.org.uk/bookbrowse.php?irn=2450&sub=&theme=home&crumb=

North
Constituencies of the Parliament of the United Kingdom established in 1885
Constituencies of the Parliament of the United Kingdom disestablished in 1918